Charles XII (Swedish: Karl XII) is a 1925 Swedish silent historical film directed by John W. Brunius and starring Gösta Ekman, Bengt Djurberg and Augusta Lindberg. Because of its long running time of nearly six hours, it was released in two separate parts. The film depicts the life of Charles XII of Sweden (1682-1718) who oversaw the expansion of the Swedish Empire until its defeat at the Battle of Poltava. It was the most expensive production in Swedish history when it was made, and inspired a string of large budget Swedish historical films.

Cast
Gösta Ekman as Karl XII 
Bengt Djurberg as Sven Björnberg 
Augusta Lindberg as majorskan Kerstin Ulfclou på Berga 
Mona Mårtenson as Anna Ulfclou 
Harry Roeck-Hansen as Erik Ulfclou, bonde 
Axel Lagerberg as Johan Ulfclou, teolog 
Paul Seelig as Bengt Ulfclou, löjtnant 
Palle Brunius as Lill-Lasse Ulfclou 
Tyra Dörum as Kajsa, piga på Berga 
Nicolai de Seversky as tsar Peter I av Ryssland
Pauline Brunius as grevinnan Aurora von Köningsmarck 
Tor Weijden as August II av Sachsen-Polen, kallad August den starke 
Einar Fröberg as Fredrik IV av Danmark
Ragnar Billberg as Hans Küsel 
Märtha Lindlöf as änkedrottning Hedvig Eleonora 
Åsa Törnekvist as prinsessan Hedvig Sofia
Edit Rolf as prinsessan Ulrika Eleonora

References

Bibliography 
 Sundholm, John & Thorsen, Isak & Andersson, Lars Gustaf & Hedling, Olof & Iversen, Gunnar & Moller, Birgir Thor. Historical Dictionary of Scandinavian Cinema. Scarecrow Press, 2012.

External links 
 

1925 films
Swedish epic films
Swedish historical drama films
Swedish silent films
1920s historical drama films
1920s Swedish-language films
Films directed by John W. Brunius
Films set in Sweden
Films set in the 1690s
Films set in the 1700s
Films set in the 1710s
Cultural depictions of Charles XII of Sweden
Swedish black-and-white films
1925 drama films
Silent historical drama films
1920s Swedish films